Ritzen is a surname. Notable people with the surname include:

 Henri Ritzen (1892–1976), Dutch painter
 Jo Ritzen (born 1945), Dutch economist and social-democratic politician
 Peter Ritzen (born 1956), Flemish pianist composer and conductor
 Per-Erik Ritzén (born 1934), Swedish modern pentathlete
 Pierre Debray-Ritzen (1922–1993), French physician and psychiatrist